The music of Argentina includes a variety of traditional, classical and popular genres. One of the country's most significant cultural contributions
is the tango, which originated in Buenos Aires and its surroundings during the end of the 19th century and underwent profound changes throughout the 20th century. Folk music was particularly popular during the 20th century, experiencing a "boom" in popularity during the 1950s and 1960s thanks to artists such as Atahualpa Yupanqui and Mercedes Sosa, prominent figures of the Nuevo cancionero movement. In the mid-to-late 1960s, the countercultural scene of Buenos Aires originated Argentine rock (known locally as rock nacional, Spanish for "national rock"), considered the earliest incarnation of Spanish-language rock for having an autochthonous identity that differed from that of England or the United States. It was widely embraced by the youth and since then has become part of the country's musical identity as much as traditional music. According to the Harvard Dictionary of Music, Argentina also "has one of the richest art music traditions and perhaps the most active contemporary musical life.

Folk music

Folk music—called música folklórica or folklore in Spanish, from the English folklore—comes in many forms, developed in different parts of Argentina with different European and indigenous influences.

Among the first traditional folk groups to record extensively in Argentina, three of the most influential were from the northwest: 
 Los Chalchaleros from the Province of Salta
 Los Fronterizos also from the Province of Salta and 
 the Ábalos brothers from Santiago del Estero Province. 

Becoming nearly instant successes following their first albums around 1950, they inspired a revival of the genre in Argentina. The folklorists Sixto Palavecino, Jorge Cafrune, Facundo Cabral and the folkloric group known as Los Manseros Santiagueños, as well as Los Nocheros are included in the genre.

Between 1960 and 1974, Leda Valladares created a documentary series, known as the Mapa musical argentino (Musical Map of Argentina), taping traditional folk music throughout the country. The recordings she made were funded by the National Endowment of the Arts and directed by Litto Nebbia for Melopea Records. 

A famous soloist in the genre is guitarist Eduardo Falú, known for the many compositions that set traditional poetry into music. Traditional folk music became increasingly important during the protest movement against the military dictatorship and the community divisions of the 1970s, with artists like Mercedes Sosa and Atahualpa Yupanqui, contributing to the development of nueva canción. Soledad Pastorutti ('La Sole') has brought folklore to a new audience, and in the early 21st century Juana Molina has proposed a fusion between electronic music and folklore with ambient sounds, a gentle voice and short zambas. In 2004 the album Cantor de Cantores, of Horacio Guarany was candidate to the Latin Grammy Award for Best Folk Album.

Notable Folk Music Festivals 
A well-known venue for Argentine folklore music, the Cosquín National Folklore Festival, has been gathering musicians from the genre annually since 1961. A modest event at first, the festival has grown to include folk musicians from neighboring countries and Asia, as well as from throughout Argentina, itself. Focusing on folklore music, the festival nevertheless features talent from the worlds of tango, acoustic music and international culture. On the same time of year is made the Cosquín Rock festival. Cosquín National Folklore Festival typically includes representatives from all musical genres created or developed in Argentina:

Variations of Argentine Folk Music By Region

Andean music

In northern Argentina, on the borders with Bolivia and Chile, the music of the Andes reflects the spirit of the land with the sounds of local wind, percussion and string instruments. Jaime Torres is a famous Argentine/Bolivian charango player.

Chacarera

Originating in Santiago del Estero, this folk music is accompanied by Spanish guitars and bombo legüero. The name originates from the word "chacra" ("farm"), as it was usually danced in rural areas, but it slowly made its way to the cities of that area. It is one of the few Argentine dances for couples where the woman has an equal opportunity to show off.

Chamamé

Accordion-based Chamamé arose in the northeastern region (provinces of Corrientes, Chaco, Formosa & Misiones) a mostly mestizo area with many settlers from Poland, Ukraine and Germany. Polkas, Mazurkas and waltzes came with these immigrants, and soon mixed with the Spanish music already present in the area. Chamamé was not very popular internationally in the 20th century, though some artists, such as Argentine superstar Raúl Barboza, became popular later in the century. In the early 21st century Chango Spasiuk, a young Argentine of Ukrainian descent from Misiones province, has once again brought chamamé to international attention.The main basis of all the music of this area on the banks of the Paraná River is its roots in the music of Paraguay across the water.

Popular music

Tango 

Tango arose in the bars and port areas of Buenos Aires, where waves of Europeans poured into the country mixing various forms of music. The result, tango, came about as a fusion of disparate influences including:

old milonga – songs of the rural gauchos
habanera – Cuban music
polka and mazurka – Slavic music
contradanse – Spanish music
flamenco – Andalusian
Italian folk music

That combination of European rhythms, brought to Argentina and Uruguay by traders and immigrants, developed into the swinging milonga around 1900. The milonga quickly became the popular dance of Buenos Aires and slowly evolved into modern tango; since 1930, tango has changed from a dance-focused music to one of lyric and poetry, thanks to vocalists like Carlos Gardel, Roberto Goyeneche, Hugo del Carril, Tita Merello, Susana Rinaldi, Edmundo Rivero and Ignacio Corsini, was equally well known as a folk singer. The golden age of tango (1930 to mid-1950s) mirrored the golden age of Jazz and Swing in the United States, featuring large orchestral tango groups, too, like the bands (known as "Orquestas típicas") led, in particular, by Francisco Canaro, Julio de Caro, Osvaldo Pugliese, Aníbal Troilo, Juan d'Arienzo, and Alfredo De Angelis.

After 1955, as the Nueva canción and Argentine rock movements stirred, tango became more intellectual and listener-oriented, led by Ástor Piazzolla's new tango. Many of the musicians that helped Piazzolla promote nuevo tango went on to develop important careers of their own, like violinist Antonio Agri, fellow bandoneón virtuosi José Libertella and Rodolfo Mederos and pianists Horacio Salgán and Pablo Ziegler, who earned a 2005 Grammy Award. Today, tango continues to produce new exponents, has experienced a major revival, and the rise of  neo tango is a global phenomenon with groups like Tanghetto, Bajofondo and Gotan Project.

In May 2019, the first Orquesta típica in the United States of America, Típica Messiez, debuted in a live performance at the Lincoln Center in NY.  The 10 instrument Orquesta plays original and traditional tango music.

Rock and roll

Argentine rock and roll is commonly known as Argentine rock or Rock Nacional (national rock). In common use, the term includes also rock and pop from Uruguay, due to the common culture, and the existence of many bands with members of both nations (for example, the website Rock.com.ar lists many bands from Uruguay, and YouTube playlists of Argentine rock commonly include bands from both countries). Though the Rock Nacional usually includes hard core bands, in general terms it incorporates the following genres: 
 Pop; (Virus, Los Abuelos de la Nada, Fito Páez), 
 Ska; (Los Fabulosos Cadillacs, Los Auténticos Decadentes), 
 Reggae; (Los Pericos), 
 Funk; (Sumo), 
 Country; (Sui Generis, Las Pastillas del Abuelo, Pedro y Pablo, León Gieco) and 
 Blues; (Manal, Memphis La Blusera).

 Argentine rock & pop in English language; (Triddana, Maxi Trusso, Siamés).

1960s 

At the time (late 60s), popular music was a style called ritmo latino, a mainstream pop genre. Bohemian hangouts in Buenos Aires and Rosario were the cradles of the genre, relying heavily on British rock influences, but in the mid-1960s musicians began exploring local musical roots, creating a local sound. Musicians like Litto Nebbia of Los Gatos began recording their own kind of rock. Los Gatos' "La balsa", released early in their year, established the distinctive sound of Argentine rock.

In 1967, in the city of Quilmes, formed one of the most important bands in the history of Argentine rock and roll: Vox Dei.

1970s 

By 1970 Argentine rock had become established among middle class youth (see Almendra, Pescado Rabioso and Sui Generis). In the 80s, Argentine rock bands became popular across Latin America and elsewhere (Serú Girán, Soda Stereo, Virus, Rata Blanca, Enanitos Verdes, Riff, Charly García).

From that decade become a staple of popular culture with many cultural/social styles: underground, mainstream oriented, some associated with:
 the working class (La Renga, Los Violadores, Hermética, Divididos, Attaque 77, Patricio Rey y sus Redonditos de Ricota) and
 underclass youth (Viejas Locas, 2 Minutos, Flema, Jóvenes Pordioseros, Intoxicados, La 25, Los Gardelitos).

1980s and 1990s 
Argentine rock and roll was the most listened-to music among youth in the late 80s and 90s; its influence and success has expanded internationally owing to a rich and uninterrupted evolution.

Popular bands and solo singers include Charly García, Indio Solari, Xavier Moyano, Skay Beilinson, Fabiana Cantilo, Andrés Ciro Martínez, Andrés Calamaro, Javier Calamaro, Sandra Mihanovich, Litto Nebbia, Juanse, :es:Pequeña Orquesta Reincidentes, La Renga, Vox Dei, Enanitos Verdes, Las Pelotas, Horcas, Los Tipitos, Carajo, Tren Loco, Jauría, Cabezones, Jóvenes Pordioseros, Kapanga, Guasones, Divididos, Attaque 77, La 25, Pez, El Otro Yo, Los Auténticos Decadentes, Casi Justicia Social, Rata Blanca, Mancha de Rolando, Viejas Locas, La Beriso, Intoxicados, Estelares, Árbol, Catupecu Machu, Almafuerte, Malón, Bersuit Vergarabat, Massacre Palestina, 2 Minutos, Los Piojos, Él Mató a un Policía Motorizado, Salta la Banca, Alejandro Toledo, Enanitos Verdes, Banda de Turistas, Satélite Kingston, Sick Porky, Hacia Dos Veranos, Caballeros de la Quema, Turf, Ciro y los Persas.

Former bands include Patricio Rey y sus Redonditos de Ricota, Soda Stereo, El Reloj, Pescado Rabioso, Serú Girán, Invisible, Los Gatos, Callejeros, Almendra, Los Violadores, Riff, V8, Ratones Paranoicos, A.N.I.M.A.L., Hermética, Latorre.

Popular Argentine rock musicians include Charly García, Gustavo Cerati, Andrés Calamaro, Luis Alberto Spinetta, Indio Solari, Litto Nebbia, Fito Páez and Pappo.

2000

Electronic 
Argentine electronic music experienced a surge of popularity in the 1990s. Rocker Gustavo Cerati switched to electronica in 1999. Electronic dance parties and shows like Creamfields BA are favorites among thousands. Prominent electronica DJs include Hernán Cattáneo who has played Burning Man. Indietronica bands like Entre Ríos have also become popular. Bajofondo Tango Club and the Gotan Project have fused tango with electronica. From the Zizek Club in Buenos Aires, ZZK Records began in 2007 to create a fusion of electronica and cumbia.

Pop 

Pop bands have seen great popularity, topped by Bandana, the most popular. Other artists in this genre include Miranda! with a touch of "electro" sound, Alejandro Lerner, Axel (singer), Valeria Lynch, María Jimena Pereyra and Babasónicos, of lasting popularity. Artists combining experimentation with glam include Airbag and Arbol, an artist combining hardcore with pop and violins. In the 2010s, Lali became the biggest exponent of pop music in Argentina. Following her debut in 2013, many artists have incursed in the genre, including Tini, Oriana, J Mena, and Emilia.

Cuarteto

Cuarteto, or Cuartetazo, is a form of dance music similar to Merengue. It became popular in Argentina during the 1940s, beginning with the genre's namesake and innovator, Cuarteto Leo and underwent a revival in the 1980s, especially in Córdoba. A national idol emerged in the brief career of Rodrigo in the late 1990s. The most popular and enduring cuarteto singer is La Mona Jiménez, who has released more than 100 albums and continues recording; his work inspired other musicians in the genre.

Cumbia

Cumbia is an important part of contemporary Argentine music, originally derived from the Colombian cumbia. This genre become popular slowly from the 1960s with the irruption in Argentina of the important Colombian bands Los Wawancó and Cuarteto Imperial. Argentine bands and soloists of cumbia originated in the north of the country and in Santa Fe province, the first regions where cumbia become popular. In the next decades cumbia widespread by all the country, becoming in the late 1990s the most popular music in the lower class. In 1999, in the north of the Greater Buenos Aires, originated a lyric style of cumbia named cumbia villera (slum cumbia), who is aggressive and explicit (similar to punk rock or gangsta rap). From the 2000s to nowadays, cumbia become the most listened music genre among the youth.

Current popular acts 
Los Palmeras, Los del Fuego, Damas Gratis, Agapornis, La Nueva Luna, Amar Azul, Mala Fama, Ráfaga, Jambao, Antonio Ríos, Daniel Agostini, Karina, Dalila, and Mario Pereyra. Popular defunct bands and deceased solo acts include: Los Wachiputos, Los Wachiturros, Yerba Brava, Pibes Chorros, La Base Musical, Grupo Sombras, Leo Mattioli and Gilda.

Urbano music

Cachengue
Cachengue, also known as Cumbiatón or Cumbia turra, is a form of Argentine cumbia that is heavily influenced by Reggaeton which became popular in Argentina during the 2010s. Artists and groups such as Los Wachiturros, Nene Malo and others became popular in mid-2011 foreign countries spreadly popularity in countries such as Bolivia, Chile and Uruguay. L-Gante started releasing new songs of this style such as "L-Gante Rkt" with Papu DJ and "L-Gante: Bzrp Music Sessions, Vol. 38" with Bizarrap. DJ Fer Palacio would start bundling up famous Reggaeton songs and would remix it to make it his own version in his "Previa and Cachengue" containing Cumbiatón with EDM influences which his video reached millions of views. Following new producers such as Facu Vazquez, DJ Alex and many others would start creating this sound in Argentina.

Trap
Trap music, although a recent novelty in Argentina and the rest of Latin America, in reality, is nothing new. It’s been around since the early 90s, when the unique mixture of electronic and hip-hop genres was born in Atlanta, Georgia. Usually including lyrics that are harsh and bleak, trap artists often use the genre as a platform for expressing their tough experiences on the street, the stark realities of a life spent in poverty, and their personal struggles for success. The word ‘trap’ refers to the places where drug deals are made. Telling the stories of the North American lower class, the emerging genre gave a voice to a generation that felt marginalized by society. The use of social media has also allowed Argentine trap artists to achieve fame and recognition much more quickly than their North American predecessors. One of these artists is Duki, who boasted over 47 million views with his single ‘Si Te Sentís Sola.’ As one of Argentina’s biggest names in trap, Duki combines rhythms found in both reggaetón and rap; his music is a unique blend of trap’s tough original sounds and more rhythmic electronic Latin American genres. Córdoba-born Paulo Londra is another young trap artist. Still living with his parents, the 20-year old rose to fame back in January 2017 with his single ‘Relax.’ Countering aggressive stereotypes often associated with trap music, Londra is keen to do things his way. His songs, which are all about positivity, good vibes, and gratitude, avoid the usual trap references to violence and drugs. Keen to push the boundaries and stray beyond the boxes of traditional trap, he’s probably the most polite trap artist around. Having already worked with the likes of Bad Bunny and J Balvin, his videos often push the view count beyond the 100 million mark.

Cumbia pop
By mid-2015, the Uruguayan and Argentine band Agapornis of the emerging subgenres "cumbia cheta" and "cumbia pop" enjoyed great success all over Latin America even before publishing their first albums; particularly in their home country and in Argentina, where in a given moment they had together nine songs at the Spotify Top Ten ranking.

Other artists

Soul/Funk 
 Power of Soul

Rap 
 Fémina
 Illya Kuryaki and the Valderramas

Reggae 
 , Todos Tus Muertos, Dread Mar-I and Fidel Nadal.

Art music

Jazz

Though much of Argentina's jazz scene revolves around the new tango popularized by Ástor Piazzolla in the 1960s, Argentine musicians have created or interpreted a considerable body of be-bop, straight-ahead and latin jazz, since then.

1950s 
Among the first to garner a wide audience was guitarist Oscar Alemán who, after performing with Brazilian artists, moved to Paris and performed for legendary dancer Josephine Baker; his swing style earned him a loyal following through the 1940s and 1950s. The popularity of mambo and latin jazz, generally, during the 1950s opened doors for drummer Tito Alberti, who recorded frequently with Cuban "mambo king" Dámaso Pérez Prado and popularized the genre locally with his renowned "Jazz Casino." The later emergence of the use of synthesizers in jazz found an Argentine adherent in Jorge Anders, whose quartet became known for modal jazz compositions like Suave como un amanecer in 1965. One of his frequent collaborators, pianist Gustavo Kereztesachi, became acclaimed for his airy interpretations of John Coltrane and Oliver Nelson standards, as well as for compositions of his own like the swinging The gun and Como luces esta noche.

1960s 
Following the emergence of "new tango" in the 1960s, one of Piazzolla's fellow bandoneónists he influenced most became a noted jazz composer in his own right. Rodolfo Mederos' 1976 album Fuera de broma 8 fused be-bop with tango and acoustic rock; Mederos has since recorded numerous albums and film scores. His success with jazz fusion inspired others, like fellow bandoneónist Dino Saluzzi, guitarist Lito Epumer and alto sax man Bernardo Baraj.

1970s to 1990s 
Later in the 1970s and through the 1990s, drummer Pocho Lapouble became well known for his jazz trio and film scores. Argentine jazz saxophonists have also become prominent in their genre. Alto saxophonist Andrés Boiarsky, who emerged in 1986 performing the film score for Hombre mirando al sudeste ("Man Facing Southeast"), records extensively to this day, collaborating with latin jazz greats like Paquito D'Rivera and Claudio Roditi. Carlos Franzetti's work and arrangements for the 1992 feature film, The Mambo Kings, earned him a Latin Grammy.

Notable Argentine Jazz Music 
The best-known Argentine jazz musician internationally is probably Leandro Gato Barbieri. The tenor saxophonist worked with renowned big band orchestra conductor Lalo Schifrin in the early 1960s, shortly before Schifrin became internationally known for his composition of the theme to Mission: Impossible. Hired by jazz trumpeter Don Cherry, the two recorded Complete Communion in 1965, an album that secured their reputation in the jazz world. Barbieri went on to record his influential Caliente! (1976), an album combining latin jazz and experimental work such as his own and jazz fusion great Carlos Santana's, as well as Qué pasa (1997), which draws more deeply from Argentine folklore roots.

Growing from the Jazzología series begun by local jazz enthusiast Carlos Inzillo in 1984, the Buenos Aires Jazz Festival has, since 2002, attracted legends and newcomers from all major jazz genres, as well as avant-garde sounds. The festival has been graced by performers like Kenny Barron, Michael Brecker, Dee Dee Bridgewater, Herbie Hancock, Freddie Hubbard, Ron Carter and Chucho Valdés.

Classical music 

The Buenos Aires Philharmonic has its home in the renowned Colón Opera House. Founded in 1946, it is considered one of the more prestigious orchestras in its nation, and has received several honors in 60 years of history. Another well established orchestra is the Argentine National Symphony Orchestra.

Prominent Argentine composers in the genre include symphonic composer Juan José Castro, Alberto Williams, who was known for his early fusion of nativist and classical genres, Carlos Guastavino, known for his romanticist works, Judith Akoschky and Alberto Ginastera, a composer considered one of the most important Argentine contributors to classical music. Internationally known performers include pianist Martha Argerich, violinist Alberto Lysy, guitarist María Isabel Siewers, tenor José Cura, mezzo-soprano Margherita Zimmermann, and pianist and conductor Daniel Barenboim, who has directed the Orchestre de Paris, the Chicago Symphony Orchestra and the Berlin State Opera. Les Luthiers are included in the genre.

Multimedia

Selections:
  Fuga y misterio. Ástor Piazzolla, music. Dancers: Vincent Morelle and Marilyne Lefor. (New Tango)
 Por una cabeza. Carlos Gardel, music and vocals; Alfredo Le Pera, lyrics. (Classic Tango)
 Medley. John Michel, cello and Mats Lidstrom, piano. (Milonga)

See also 

 Tango
 Public domain music

References

Brill, Mark. Music of Latin America and the Caribbean, 2nd Edition, 2018. Taylor & Francis 
Fairley, Jan and Teddy Peiro. "Vertical Expression of Horizontal Desire". 2000. In Broughton, Simon and Ellingham, Mark with McConnachie, James and Duane, Orla (Ed.), World Music, Vol. 2: Latin & North America, Caribbean, India, Asia and Pacific, pp 304–314. Rough Guides Ltd, Penguin Books. 
Fairley, Jan. "Dancing Cheek to Cheek...". 2000. In Broughton, Simon and Ellingham, Mark with McConnachie, James and Duane, Orla (Ed.), World Music, Vol. 2: Latin & North America, Caribbean, India, Asia and Pacific, pp 315–316. Rough Guides Ltd, Penguin Books. 
Fairley, Jan. "An Uncompromising Song". 2000. In Broughton, Simon and Ellingham, Mark with McConnachie, James and Duane, Orla (Ed.), World Music, Vol. 2: Latin & North America, Caribbean, India, Asia and Pacific, pp 362–371. Rough Guides Ltd, Penguin Books. 
Latin American Music Styles
"Fanfarria Latina". La Fanfarria del Capitán. Retrieved 2013-10-28. Capitan Official

External links
BBC Radio 3 Audio (60 minutes): Tango. Accessed 25 November 2010.
BBC Radio 3 Audio (60 minutes): The Humahuaca Valley. Accessed 25 November 2010.
 www.argentina.ar: Argentine music history]

 
Southern cone music
Articles containing video clips